A province is a geographic region within Gaelic games, consisting of several counties of the Gaelic Athletic Association (GAA) and originally based on the historic four provinces of Ireland as they were set in 1610.

Provincial councils
A provincial council is responsible for the organisation of club and inter-county competitions such as the provincial championships, and the promotion of Gaelic games within its region. This region consists of several county boards. Listed below are the five existing provincial councils (four of which are on the island of Ireland). The British GAA is the fifth provincial council. To the right is a map showing the location of the provinces of Ireland, i.e. north, south, east, west. Another map below it indicates Britain in relation to Ireland.

Connacht
Leinster
Munster
Ulster
Britain

The ultimate goal of Gaelic Games Europe (the European county board) is to become a provincial council.

Gaelic games in North America acts as a provincial council for clubs and the three county teams in North America.

Provincial championships

Championships

Football
 Connacht Senior Football Championship
Leinster Senior Football Championship
Munster Senior Football Championship
Ulster Senior Football Championship
All-Britain Junior Football Championship

Hurling
 Connacht Senior Hurling Championship
Leinster Senior Hurling Championship
Munster Senior Hurling Championship
Ulster Senior Hurling Championship

A provincial championship is a competition in which counties compete against rival counties from the same province. However, there is variation. For instance, Antrim and Galway have competed in the Leinster Senior Hurling Championship despite not being from Leinster. This is due to the strength of their teams with respect to other counties in their province. Teams representing London GAA, though based in Britain, have competed in the Connacht Senior Football Championship and Ulster Senior Hurling Championship (e.g. in 2010).

Setanta Sports broadcasts live provincial championships matches in Australia. Setanta Sports also provides matches from the provincial championships in Asia.

Roll of honour
Football

References

Gaelic games culture
Gaelic games terminology